Bharti Singh (born 3 July 1984) is an Indian comedian and television personality. Singh has created numerous comedy shows as well as hosted various award shows. She participated in the reality shows Jhalak Dikhhla Jaa 5 (2012), Nach Baliye 8 (2017) and Fear Factor: Khatron Ke Khiladi 9 (2019). In 2019, she appeared on Khatra Khatra Khatra, a show conceptualised by her husband Haarsh Limbachiyaa for Colors TV. Since 2016, Singh has appeared in Forbes India's celebrity 100 list.

Early life
Bharti was born on 3 July 1984 in Amritsar city of Punjab in a Punjabi family. Her father was from Nepal. Her father died when she was two years old. Singh has two older siblings, a brother and a sister.

Career 
Bharti was the 2nd runner-up in the stand-up comedy reality series The Great Indian Laughter Challenge on STAR One, where she received critical acclaim for her stand-up comedy child character named Lalli. She then appeared as a contestant on Comedy Circus. She hosted the show Comedy Nights Bachao along with Krishna Abhishek.

In 2011, she acted in the TV series Pyaar Mein Twist on STAR Plus and later appeared as a contestant on the celebrity dance reality show Jhalak Dikhhla Jaa 5 (2012). In 2012, she hosted the television show Sau Saal Cinema Ke, which premiered on 15 December 2012 on Star Plus alongside Karan Tacker, Ragini Khanna and Shruti Ulfat. She also appeared as a guest on MasterChef India. and Nach Baliye 6.

She hosted India's Got Talent 5 (2014), India's Got Talent 6 (2015) and India's Got Talent 7 (2016). In 2017, she participated in Nach Baliye 8 on Star Plus along with Haarsh Limbachiyaa and finished in 6th place. In 2018, she appeared as a guest on the reality shows Dance Deewane and Bigg Boss 12, both on Colors TV. In the same year, she hosted India's Got Talent 8 on Colors TV and appeared on the comedy show The Kapil Sharma Show on Sony TV as Titli Yadav. In 2019, she participated in Fear Factor: Khatron Ke Khiladi 9 on Colors TV along with Haarsh Limbachiyaa again. Although Haarsh got eliminated in the 7th week, she managed to become a finalist and survive till the grand finale. She got evicted just before the grand finale.

In 2020, Bharti hosted Sony TV's India's Best Dancer and Colors TV's Hum Tum Aur Quarantine along with Haarsh Limbachiyaa. She also participated in Fear Factor: Khatron Ke Khiladi – Made in India and emerged as the 4th runner-up. 

In 2022, she hosted Colors TV's show Hunarbaaz: Desh Ki Shaan along with Haarsh Limbachiyaa.

Personal life 

On 3 December 2017, Singh married writer Haarsh Limbachiyaa after dating him for few years. 

Singh has also been nationally ranked in archery and pistol shooting.

On 21 November 2020, the Narcotics Control Bureau conducted a search at Bharti's residence and recovered 86.5 g of cannabis. She and her husband were taken in for questioning and they were later arrested by the bureau. She and her husband were granted bail on 23 November 2020, after 2 days of interrogation. 

On 3 April 2022, the couple had their first child, a boy, Laksh Singh Limbaachiya nicknamed Golla.

Filmography

Films

Television

References

External links

 
 
 

1984 births
21st-century Indian actresses
Living people
Actresses from Amritsar
Indian stand-up comedians
Indian film actresses
Actresses in Hindi cinema
Actresses in Punjabi cinema
Participants in Indian reality television series
Indian television actresses
Punjabi people
Indian people of Nepalese descent
Women humorists
Fear Factor: Khatron Ke Khiladi participants